The Junior Ranger Program, in brief, is a program where kids (and adults) can learn about a park through self guided interactive activities, such as scavenger hunts, crosswords, and even poetry writing. After completing the specified amount of pages, depending on the participants age, the participant is awarded a patch, badge and/or certificate, unique to each park.  

Generally participants can pick up activity books, which are generally free, but in a few cases can cost up to $3, at a park’s visitor center or a ranger station. The activity books direct participants to areas they might otherwise miss, and/or hidden gems. The booklets contain information that helps participants discover the importance of a park on their own terms, and decide what the park means to them personally. 

Yosemite National Park was the first to start the Junior Ranger program back in the early 1900s. 

Since then it has spread to almost all the 423 national park sites and across some of our public lands from the Bureau of Land Management, to National wildlife refuges, to the Army Corps of engineers.

Specialty Badges and Patches

Some parks or groups of parks offer specialty badges or patches and a certificate signed by a ranger.  For example, select participating parks now offer a Junior Civil War Historian badge for participants who complete three activities -- either junior ranger books at three parks or junior ranger books at two parks and one online activity.  Select participating parks offer a Junior Paleontologist program.  Select participating parks offer a Santa Fe National Historic Trail Junior Ranger program.  Some sites also offer additional patches for older participants.  Organ Pipe Cactus National Monument offers both a Junior Ranger patch and a Desert Ranger patch for older participants.  Guadalupe Mountains National Park offers a Junior Ranger patch, a Senior Ranger patch and a Wilderness Explorer patch.  Bandelier National Monument offers four different patches based on age groups.  The parks either offer different books for different age groups or a single book that requires a different number of activities be completed based on the child's age.  Often the activities are coded with a visual clue on which activities are appropriate for a particular age group.  Parks may post their books on line so they can be printed out ahead of time, such as this one from Harper's Ferry National Historic Park.
Junior Civil War Historian Program
Junior Paleontologist Program
 Santa Fe National Historic Trail Junior Ranger Program
Organ Pipe Cactus Junior Ranger and Desert Ranger
Guadalupe Mountains Junior Ranger, Senior Ranger, Junior Paleontologist, Wilderness Explorer
Junior Ranger Night Explorers
Some parks offer completion of their Junior Ranger programs by mail.  You can download and print the book at home and mail it in once it's been completed.  These are primarily offered at sites that are more remote and offer children the opportunity to learn about that location even though they can't actually visit in person.
 National Park of American Samoa
 Discovering the Underground Railroad
War in the Pacific National Historical Park

Some badges are event specific and can only be earned during certain periods and only by those actually attending the event.
 Presidential Inauguration
 Cherry Blossom Festival
Other badges can be earned totally on line when a particular site is closed for an extended period of time.
 Clara Barton National Historic Site

There is also a new (as of 2019) Junior Ranger Passport Stamp program.  The program is voluntary for the parks, but the stamps were sent out to parks with Junior Ranger programs.  There may also be some parks with Junior Ranger cancellations that are not on the published list.

Participating parks
Nearly all of the 424 national park sites participate in the program along with many National Wildlife Refuges, Bureau of Land Management, Army Corps of engineers, most state parks, and some county parks. 

There are many resources from lists to maps to help people visualize and see which parks participate in this program. One of the most complete resources is the map linked below to see exactly who has the program. 
https://tiny.one/Junior-ranger-map

Reference

External links

 World Heritage in the United states website 
Official website of the Junior Ranger Program
Junior Ranger Cancellation Station Locations
Be a Junior Civil War Historian
Oregon Junior Ranger Participating Parks List
California Junior Ranger Participating Parks List - Note: California uses the same badge at all parks
 A Junior Ranger's Guide to the US National Parks was written by Eric Feichthaler after he earned Junior Ranger badges at 50 US National Parks. His journal and drawings are designed to inspire other kids and their families to visit US National Parks and become Junior Rangers.

National Park Service